Škocjan is a Slovene place name that may refer to several places in Slovenia or nearby (in Austria and Italy).

Slovenia
Settlements
Rakov Škocjan, a settlement in the Municipality of Cerknica, southwestern Slovenia
Škocjan, Divača, a settlement in the Municipality of Divača, southwestern Slovenia
Škocjan, Domžale, a settlement in the Municipality of Domžale, central Slovenia
Škocjan, Grosuplje, a settlement in the Municipality of Grosuplje, central Slovenia
Škocjan, Koper, a settlement in the City Municipality of Koper, southwestern Slovenia
Škocjan, Škocjan, a settlement in the Municipality of Škocjan, southeastern Slovenia

Landforms
Rak Škocjan, a valley and a landscape park near Rakov Škocjan in the Municipality of Cerknica, southwestern Slovenia
Škocjan Caves, caves near Škocjan in the Municipality of Divača, southwestern Slovenia
 Škocjan Caves Regional Park

Municipality
Municipality of Škocjan, a municipality in southeastern Slovenia

Outside Slovenia
Austria
 Škocjan v Podjuni, German Sankt Kanzian am Klopeiner See, a municipality in the Austrian state of Carinthia. 
 , a hamlet in the Municipality of Finkenstein am Faaker See, Carinthia

Italy
 Škocjan ob Soči, Italian San Canzian d'Isonzo, a municipality in Friuli – Venezia Giulia.